Verkhnelebyazhye is a rural locality (a selo) in Volzhsky Selsoviet, Narimanovsky District, Astrakhan Oblast, Russia. The population was 361 as of 2010. There are 14 streets.

Geography 
Verkhnelebyazhye is located 13 km north of Narimanov (the district's administrative centre) by road. Narimanov is the nearest rural locality.

References 

Rural localities in Narimanovsky District